Long An Stadium is a multi-purpose stadium in Tân An, Vietnam.  It is currently used mostly for football matches and is the home stadium of Dong Tam, also known as ÐTLA.  The stadium holds 19,975 people.  

Football venues in Vietnam
Multi-purpose stadiums in Vietnam
Buildings and structures in Long An province